Revista 22 (22 Magazine) is a Romanian weekly magazine, issued by the Group for Social Dialogue and focused mainly on politics and culture.

History and profile
Revista 22 was started in 1990. The first edition of the magazine was printed on 20 January 1990. The magazine was named in memory of 22 December 1989, the day the communist regime in Romania was overthrown. The founder was the Group for Social Dialogue, which is also the publisher. The magazine is published in Bucharest weekly on Tuesdays.

References

External links
 Revista 22

1990 establishments in Romania
Magazines established in 1990
Magazines published in Bucharest
Political magazines published in Romania
Romanian-language magazines
Romanian Revolution
Weekly magazines published in Romania